Byron Tokarchuk (born November 29, 1965 in Saskatoon, Saskatchewan) is a former basketball player from Canada, who played at the University of Saskatchewan Huskies in Saskatoon, with teammates David Karwacki (former leader of the Saskatchewan Liberal Party), John Cleland, Kirk Jones, and former Huskies Head Coach Greg Jockims.   He and his teammates went on to the CIAU nationals twice.  

Byron was a member of the 1983 Canadian National Junior team, and went on to play for the Canadian Men's National Team between 1984 and 1989. He was on the Canadian team that won Bronze at the World university games in Kobe, Japan.

He was named as  first team All-Canadian four consecutive years, named Canada West Player of the year three times, and went on to play professionally overseas in Mexico, and the UAE.  He held multiple records at the University of Saskatchewan, including most points scored in a game, and his all-time career scoring mark was recently eclipsed by Andrew Spagrud in 2008.  

He was invited to participate in the San Antonio Spurs rookie camp in 1989.

References
https://web.archive.org/web/20071219011032/http://www.frozenhoops.com/id82.html
http://huskies.usask.ca
http://www.chebucto.ns.ca/Recreation/CIAU/AllCdn.html
https://web.archive.org/web/20110720185543/http://www.canadawest.org/m_basketball/bbm_AllStands_Records.pdf

1965 births
Living people
Canadian expatriate basketball people
Canadian expatriate basketball people in Mexico
Canadian expatriate sportspeople in the United Arab Emirates
Canadian men's basketball players
Basketball people from Saskatchewan
Sportspeople from Saskatoon
Saskatchewan Huskies basketball players
Universiade medalists in basketball
Universiade bronze medalists for Canada
Medalists at the 1985 Summer Universiade